William Ebsworth James (17 December 1891–1960) was an English footballer who played in the Football League for Middlesbrough, Portsmouth and West Ham United.

References

1891 births
1960 deaths
English footballers
Association football forwards
English Football League players
Eston United F.C. players
Middlesbrough F.C. players
Portsmouth F.C. players
West Ham United F.C. players